Shigeo Yanagida (柳田 殖生, born March 31, 1982, in Nishiwaki, Hyōgo, Japan) is a Japanese former professional baseball infielder and current coach for the Yokohama DeNA BayStars in Japan's Nippon Professional Baseball. He played with Chunichi Dragons from 2007 to 2013 and with Yokohama from 2014 to 2016.

External links

1982 births
Living people
Baseball people from Hyōgo Prefecture
Japanese baseball players
Nippon Professional Baseball infielders
Chunichi Dragons players
Yokohama DeNA BayStars players
Japanese baseball coaches
Nippon Professional Baseball coaches